Armavir may refer to:

Places
 Armavir, Armenia, formerly Sardarapat and Hoktemberyan
 Armavir Province, an administrative division of which Armavir is the capital
 Armavir (ancient city), capital of ancient Armenia during the Orontid Dynasty
 Armavir (village), 1 km from ancient Armavir
 Armavir, Russia, a city, and the administrative division of Armavir Urban Okrug
 Armavir (air base), a military airfield 
Armavir Radar Station, a missile attack early warning station

Other uses
Armavir (film), a 1991 Soviet drama film 
FC Armavir, a Russian football club 
FC Armavir (Armenia), a defunct Armenian football club
, earlier named Armavir, a 1940s Soviet cargo ship

See also

Nor Armavir, a village in the Armavir Province of Armenia